Nicholas Peter Susoeff (April 15, 1921 – January 31, 1967) was a professional American football player. He played four seasons with the San Francisco 49ers of the All-America Football Conference.

References

External links
 

1921 births
1967 deaths
San Francisco 49ers (AAFC) players
Second Air Force Superbombers football players
Washington State Cougars football players
People from Umatilla County, Oregon
Players of American football from Oregon
San Francisco 49ers players